What a Week to Get Real is the eighth part of What a Week series by Rosie Rushton. It was published in 2005 by Piccadilly Press Ltd.

Plot summary 
Jade is going to Paris with her grandmother. She meets a boy – Flynn Jackson – in the train to Brighton. They become friends. Flynn lives in Dunchester, so Jade can see him. They fall in love with each other quickly. Jade is trying to help Tansy with Andy, who doesn't talk to her. She sends text messages, which are supposed to be from Tansy.

Cleo is still in love with Angus. But he only pretends to be interested with her. He shows his parents that he's normal by "going out" with Cleo. The girl sings with his and Kyle's band on the music festival. But they don't win the prize. Cleo breaks up with Angus, because she is upset of being not exactly his girlfriend. She could also see that, Angus is more interested in Kyle.

Holly's parents want to sell their house. The buyers are Walker family – Angus and his parents. Unfortunately, before selling a house there is a fire in it that burns the whole house. Holly saved her nephew from the burning house, but she had to stay at the hospital, because she had burns on her legs. She still is afraid of the fire and sometimes she has panic attack.

Tansy's private life is complicated. Andy doesn't talk to her and she doesn't know why. Then she discovers that he went to a party and he got drunk. He also was kissing Melanie, who is Tansy's rival. Luckily, he explains her everything and they are together again.

Characters 
Tansy Meadows – Clarity's daughter. She met her father, but he doesn't keep in touch with her. She's got a boyfriend – Andy Richards, who she really loves.  
Cleopatra "Cleo" Greenway – Tansy's, Jade's and Holly's friend. She fell in love with Angus, who doesn't know who he prefers – boys or girls. Her mother is a well-known actress. 
Holly Vine – Tansy's best friend. She wears very fashionable clothes and is very pretty. She has got a boyfriend – Ben.
Jade Williams – she's an orphan, who lost her parents in a car accident. She lives with her uncle and aunt. She went to Paris with her grandmother. She met Flynn Jackson in the train to Brighton.
Clarity Meadows – Tansy's mother. She is godmother to Andy's brother and sister.
Diana Greenway – Cleo's mother. She is a well-known actress.
Roy – Cleo's stepfather.
Angela Vine – Holly's mother.
Rupert Vine – Holly's father.
Allegra – Jade's cousin. She's Scott's girlfriend.
aunt Paula – Jade's aunt and Allegra's mother.
Andy Richards – Tansy's boyfriend. 
Alan Richards – Andy's father.
Valerie Richards – Andy's mother.
Flynn Jackson – Jade's new friend. He had an accident and he can't walk.
Kyle Woodward – a boy, with who Holly fell in love. When she realised that, he's a gay she found another boyfriend.
Angus Walker – Kyle's friend. Cleo fell in love with him, but he only pretends that she's his girlfriend.

British young adult novels
2005 British novels
Novels by Rosie Rushton